Don Gil of the Green Breeches (Spanish: Don Gil de las calzas verdes) is a 1615 comedy by the Spanish playwright Tirso de Molina.

External links
2014 adaptation by Sean O'Brien

1615 plays
Comedy plays
Plays by Tirso de Molina